Ruy Duarte (30 June 1911 – 5 May 1990) was a Brazilian modern pentathlete. He competed at the 1936 Summer Olympics.

References

External links
 

1911 births
1990 deaths
Brazilian male modern pentathletes
Olympic modern pentathletes of Brazil
Modern pentathletes at the 1936 Summer Olympics
20th-century Brazilian people